Rebecca Luker (April 17, 1961 – December 23, 2020) was an American actress, singer, and recording artist, noted for her "crystal clear operatic soprano" and for maintaining long runs in Broadway musicals over the course of her three-decade-long career. The New York Times compared her to actresses such as Barbara Cook and Julie Andrews. 

Beginning in regional theatre productions in the early 1980s, Luker originated the role of Lily in The Secret Garden on Broadway in 1991. She was nominated for three Tony Awards, for her performances as Magnolia in Show Boat (1994), Marian in The Music Man (2000) and Winifred in Mary Poppins (2006), another role that she created. She performed widely in theatre throughout her career and also gave concert and cabaret performances. She began acting in television in 2000 and made several films. Luker continued to act until the year of her death, at the age of 59, from amyotrophic lateral sclerosis. She can be heard on more than 20 cast albums and various other recordings.

Life and career
Luker, the daughter of Martha (Baggett), a high school treasurer, and Norse Doak Luker, Jr., a construction worker, was born in Birmingham, Alabama and grew up in the suburb of Helena. She attended the University of Montevallo, earning a BA in music, taking a year off in 1984 to perform in Sweeney Todd as Johanna Barker at the Michigan Opera Theatre.

Luker's Broadway debut was in The Phantom of the Opera in the role of Christine (1988–91). She was originally an understudy for principal actress Sarah Brightman and her alternate Patti Cohenour. Luker later took over the role after Brightman and Cohenour left the show. Subsequent Broadway roles include Lily in The Secret Garden (1991–93), Magnolia in Show Boat (1994–97, the first actress to be nominated for a Tony Award for this role), Maria in The Sound of Music (1998–99), Marian in The Music Man (2000–2001), and Claudia in Nine (2003). She played the role of Mrs. Banks in Mary Poppins from 2006 to 2010. She later replaced Victoria Clark as Crazy Marie/the Fairy Godmother in the Broadway production of Cinderella for an engagement that lasted from September 2013 to January 2014. Luker joined the cast of Fun Home at the Circle in the Square Theatre on Broadway, temporarily assuming the role of Helen Bechdel from April 5, 2016 to May 22, 2016.

Luker appeared Off-Broadway in The Vagina Monologues, Indian Summer, X (Life of Malcolm X), Brigadoon, Death Takes a Holiday, and Can't Let Go. During 2002, the Kennedy Center presented a "Sondheim Celebration"; Luker appeared in Passion as Clara. She performed in the New York City Center Encores! staged concerts of The Boys from Syracuse and Where's Charley?. Her TV appearances include Boardwalk Empire, The Good Wife, Matlock, Law & Order: Special Victims Unit, and the Hallmark movie Cupid & Cate. She appeared in the 2012 film Not Fade Away. On January 11, 2016, Luker reprised the role of Lily in The Secret Garden at a benefit performance at the Lucille Lortel Theatre.

Luker performed as a concert soloist with symphony orchestras around the world and in intimate solo settings. She performed a solo concert as part of the American Songbook Series at Lincoln Center in 2005, featuring 20 songs composed by a group of younger songwriters including Paul Loesel, Scott Burkell, Jeff Blumenkranz, Barry Kleinbort, and Joseph Thalken. Her 2006 solo cabaret debut at Feinstein's at the Regency received rave reviews from The New York Times and Variety as well as the Bisto award for best debut concert. She performed in 2008 solo concert at Kennedy Center's Terrace Theatre, a 2011 concert featuring the music of Rodgers and Hammerstein (again at Kennedy Center), and in 2012, the "Bridge to Broadway" as part of the NYC River to River Festival and "NEW VOICES at NYU: A Celebration of Songs by NYU Musical Theatre Writers Past and Present". 
 
In 2001, Luker, Truman Capote, and the film version of To Kill a Mockingbird were all inducted into the Alabama Stage and Screen Hall of Fame. She also received a doctorate of fine arts, honoris causa, on May 5, 2010 from her alma mater, the University of Montevallo.

Personal life
Luker married Gregory Jbara in 1993. They divorced in 1996. She married Danny Burstein in June 2000, becoming stepmother to his sons Zachary and Alexander.

On February 9, 2020, Luker announced that she was suffering from amyotrophic lateral sclerosis (ALS), having been diagnosed in late 2019. In June 2020, she could still sing, as she hosted a livestreamed benefit for ALS. However, in October, she said she had been using a wheelchair for seven months, and the disease had progressed to the point where she had "no diaphragm," thus could not speak loudly.

In April 2020, Burstein contracted COVID-19 (along with several other cast members of Moulin Rouge!, in which he was starring). He was hospitalized at St. Luke's in Manhattan and recovered. Following his ordeal, Burstein wrote an account of it that was published in The Hollywood Reporter. Toward the end of that article, Burstein wrote, "while I'm getting better, Rebecca has started dealing with the virus as well now. She's not been tested, but has all the symptoms to varying degrees. We are monitoring her closely." Luker ultimately had a much milder case than her husband.

Luker died of ALS at a hospital in Manhattan on December 23, 2020, at age 59.

Stage credits

Broadway

Other

Filmography

Television

Film

Awards and nominations

Discography

Solo recordings
I Got Love - Songs of Jerome Kern (2013, PS Classics)
Greenwich Time (2009, PS Classics)
Leaving Home (2004, PS Classics)
Anything Goes: Rebecca Luker Sings Cole Porter (1996, Varèse Sarabande)

Cast recordings
 Passion (2013 New York Cast Recording, PS Classics)
Jerome Kern:  The Land Where the Good Songs Go - A New Revue (2012 Studio Cast Recording, 101 Distribution, PS Classics)
Sweet Little Devil (2012 Studio Cast Recording, PS Classics)
 Death Takes a Holiday (2011 Original Off-Broadway Cast Recording, PS Classics)
Sweet Bye and Bye (2011 Studio Cast Recording, PS Classics)
Life Begins at 8:40 (2010 World Premiere Recording, PS Classics)
Kitty’s Kisses (2009 World Premiere Recording, PS Classics)
Dear Edwina (2008 World Premiere Recording, PS Classics)
Brownstone (2003 Studio Cast Recording, Original Cast Record)
Everybody’s Getting into the Act (2003 Studio Cast Recording, Varèse Sarabande)
The Music Man (2000 New Broadway Cast Recording, Q Records)
Wonderful Town (1998 Studio Cast Recording, JAY Records)
The Sound of Music (1998 New Broadway Cast Recording, RCA Victor)
The Boys from Syracuse (1997 Encores! Cast Recording, DRG Records)
Show Boat (1994 Revival Cast Album, Livent Music)
Brigadoon (1992 Studio Cast Album, EMI Records)
 The Secret Garden (1991 Original Broadway Cast Album, Columbia Records)
Strike Up the Band (1991 Studio Cast Album, Elektra Nonesuch)
 Annie Get Your Gun (1991 Studio Cast Album, EMI Records)
Kiss Me, Kate (1990 Studio Cast Album, EMI Records)
Show Boat (1988 Studio Cast Album, EMI Records)

Featured recordings
Over the Moon: The Broadway Lullaby Project (2012, Over the Moon)
Victor Herbert: Collected Songs (2012, New World Records)
Show Some Beauty (2011, Yellow Sound Label)
Poetic License 100 Poems/100 Performers (2010, GPR Records)
Tom Herman: Music for Voice (2008, CDBY)
State of Grace III (2006, Koch Int’l Classics)
The Real Thing: Jamie deRoy and Friends, Volume 7 (2006, Harbinger Records)
Jule Styne in Hollywood (2006, PS Classics)
Philip Chaffin: Warm Spring Night (2005, PS Classics)
Jeepers Creepers: Great Songs from Horror Films (2003, Red Circle)
Aria 3: Metamorphosis (2003, Koch Records)
Believe: The Songs of The Sherman Brothers (2003, Varèse Sarabande)
Sweet Appreciation: Rusty Magee Live at the West Bank Café (2002, SixFootPlusMusic)
Peter Buchi: An American Voice (2002, Azica)
My Favorite Broadway: The Love Songs (2001, Hybrid Recordings)
Aria 2: New Horizon (1999, Astor Place Recordings)
A Little Bit in Love (1999 Compilation Album, JAY Records)
Simple Gifts: Carols from the Abbey (1998, Broadway Cares/Equity Fights AIDS)
Bernstein Dances (1998, Deutsche Grammophon)
A Special Place: Songs from the Heart (1998, Original Cast Records)
George & Ira Gershwin: Standards & Gems (1998 Compilation Album, Nonesuch Records)
The Best of the Broadway Divas (1997 Compilation Album, Varèse Sarabande)
The Best of In Celebration of Life 1-5 (Broadway Cares/Equity Fights AIDS)
Aria (1997, Astor Place Recordings)
Beauty and the Beast: The Enchanted Christmas (1997, Walt Disney Records)
Unsung Musicals II (1995, Varèse Sarabande)
Lost in Boston III (1995, Varèse Sarabande)
Voices of Broadway:  Songs of Conscience and Hope (1994, Broadway Cares/Equity Fights AIDS)
Musicals! (1993 Compilation Album, EMI Records)
Unsung Sondheim (1993, Varèse Sarabande)
Jerome Kern Treasury (1993, EMI Records)
Jerome Kern in London and Hollywood (1992, Rialto Records)
Broadway Showstoppers (1992, EMI Records)
Sing Before Breakfast (1991, Rialto Records)
Plácido Domingo: The Broadway I Love (1991, Warner Music)
Early Kern (1991, Rialto Recordings)
Keep Your Undershirt On (1990, Rialto Recordings)

References

External links
 
 
 
 
 

1961 births
2020 deaths
20th-century American actresses
20th-century American singers
20th-century American women singers
21st-century American actresses
21st-century American singers
21st-century American women singers
Actresses from Alabama
Actresses from Birmingham, Alabama
American musical theatre actresses
American sopranos
Musicians from Birmingham, Alabama
People from Helena, Alabama
Neurological disease deaths in New York (state)
Deaths from motor neuron disease
Singers from Alabama
University of Montevallo alumni